Tom tom or TomTom may refer to:
 Tom-tom, a cylindrical drum with no snare
 TomTom, a Dutch manufacturer of navigation systems
 Tom Tom (TV series), a 1960s science-themed children's television series on BBC TV
 Project Tom-Tom, a fighter plane experiment after the FICON project
 Tom Tom Magazine, a quarterly about women drummers

See also
 Tom Tom Club, a New Wave band
 Tom Tom Club (album), an album by Tom Tom Club
 Tom Tom Blues, an album by The 77s
 "Tom Tom Tom", a Finnish entry in the Eurovision Song Contest 1973 by Marion Rung
 "Tom, Tom, the Piper's Son", a nursery rhyme
 Tommy & the Tom Toms, an American musical group active 1959-1962